Egyptian Army Stadium – Suez is an all-seated association football stadium in Suez, Egypt. The stadium was built in 2009 as one of the venues for the 2009 FIFA U-20 World Cup, which was hosted by Egypt.

The stadium was known as Mubarak International Stadium until 2011 and was changed to Egyptian Army Stadium as a result of the 2011 Egyptian revolution, which removed Hosni Mubarak from being the president of Egypt.

References

Football venues in Egypt
Buildings and structures in Suez Governorate
Sports venues completed in 2009
2009 establishments in Egypt
21st-century architecture in Egypt